Waldrep is a family name that may refer to:

Barry Waldrep (born 1962), an American musician, songwriter and composer. 
G.C. Waldrep (born 1968), an American poet and historian
Phil Waldrep (born 1960), an ordained Southern Baptist minister, speaker and author 
Waldrep Dairy Farm in Florida